H Project, also Hashima Project or Project Hashima, is a 2013 Thai horror film directed by Piyapan Choopetch.

Synopsis
Five teenage students visit Hashima Island in Japan to film a paranormal TV program, because they do not believe the stories of this island. They find something that is trying to haunt them.

Cast
Main cast
Alex Rendell - Aof
Apinya Sakuljaroensuk - Nan
Pirat Nitipaisalkul - Nick
Mek Mekwattana - Doc
Sucharat Manaying - May
Supporting cast
Shô Nishino - Ms. Miko
Pattanapon  Goonchorn Na Ayuthaya - Jo
Bungo Satō - Mr. Satō
Pongthep Anurat - Pub owner
Nonzee Nimibutr - Himself (cameo)

References

External links
 

Thai-language films
2010s Japanese-language films
Thai horror films
Films set in Japan
Films shot in Nagasaki